Starwater Strains is a collection of short stories by American writer Gene Wolfe. While his previous collection, Innocents Aboard, contained fantasy and horror stories, this one largely consists of science fiction.

Contents
"Viewpoint"
"Rattler" (with Brian A. Hopkins)
"In Glory like Their Star"
"Calamity Warps"
"Shields of Mars"
"From the Cradle"
"Black Shoes"
"Has Anyone Seen Junie" Moon?"
"Pulp Cover"
"Of Soil and Climes"
"Dog of the Drops"
"Mute"
"Petting Zoo"
"The Fat Magician"
"Hunter Lake"
"The Boy Who Hooked the Sun"
"Try and Kill It"
"Game in the Popes Head"
"Empires of Foliage and Flower"
"The Armaspian Legacy"
"The Seraph and the Sepulchre"
'Lord of the Land"
"Golden City Far"

2005 short story collections
Science fiction short story collections
Short story collections by Gene Wolfe
Tor Books books